Joshua Jamie Dell (born 26 September 1997) is an English cricketer. He made his List A debut for Worcestershire against the West Indies A in a tri-series warm-up match on 19 June 2018. He made his first-class debut on 14 May 2019, for Worcestershire in the 2019 County Championship.

References

External links
 

1997 births
Living people
People from Tenbury Wells
English cricketers
Worcestershire cricketers
People educated at Cheltenham College
Sportspeople from Worcestershire